The Trade Boards Act 1918 (c 32) was an Act of the Parliament of the United Kingdom that heavily shaped the post-World War I system of UK labour law, particularly regarding collective bargaining and the establishment of minimum wages. It was the result of the second of five Whitley Committee reports.

Background
The 1918 extended the piecemeal system for tackling sweated labour begun under the Trade Boards Act 1909. The Second Reading took place on 17 June 1918. It received Royal Assent on 8 August 1918.

Contents

Case law
Pauley v Kenaldo Ld [1953] 1 W.L.R. 187
Hulland v William Sanders & Son [1945] K.B. 78, extension of terms
National Association of Local Government Officers v Bolton Corp [1943] A.C. 166  
Nathan v Gulkoff & Levy Ltd [1933] Ch. 809  
R v Minister of Labour Ex p. National Trade Defence Association [1932] 1 K.B. 1  
France v James Coombes and Company [1929] AC 496
Skinner v Jack Breach Ltd [1927] 2 K.B. 220

See also
UK labour law
Trade Boards Act 1909
Wages Councils Act 1945
National Minimum Wage Act 1998
Liberal reforms

Notes

United Kingdom Acts of Parliament 1918
United Kingdom labour law
1918 in labor relations